, birth name Okajima Tōjiro (1773–1828), was a Japanese ukiyo-e artist and painter. He was a member of the Utagawa school and studied under Utagawa Toyoharu, the school's founder. His works include a number of ukiyo-e landscape series, as well as many depictions of the daily activities in the Yoshiwara entertainment quarter; many of his stylistic features paved the way for Hokusai and Hiroshige (the latter a prodigy who studied under Toyohiro, becoming one of the very finest of all landscape artists), as well as producing an important series of ukiyo-e triptychs in collaboration with Toyokuni, and numerous book and e-hon illustrations, which occupied him in his later years.

The ukiyo-e series he produced include the following:
 Eight Views of Edo (several series)
 Eight Views of Ōmi (several series)
 Newly Published Perspective Pieces (Shinpan uki-e)
 Twelve Months by Two Artists, Toyokuni and Toyohiro (Toyokuni Toyohiro ryōga jūnikō), with Toyokuni
 Untitled series of A Day in the Life of a Geisha
 Untitled series of Eight Views of Edo in the Snow
 The Six Great Poets
 The Twelve Hours
 The Four Accomplishments
 The Three Cities

Gallery

References
 Hillier, Jack Ronald. 1970. Catalogue of the Japanese paintings and prints in the Collection of Mr. & Mrs. Richard P. Gale, Vol. 1, p. 346. Taylor & Francis, Dec 31, 1970.
Wendy shore,Woodbine Books 1980, Ukiyo-e published by Castle Books for Library of fine Arts p. 26

1773 births
1828 deaths
Ukiyo-e artists
Utagawa school